Paradisea (paradise lily) is a European genus of flowering plants in the family Asparagaceae. It was formerly classified in the family Anthericaceae or earlier in the Liliaceae. Paradisea is sometimes confused with Anthericum.

Species
Paradisea contains two species of herbaceous perennials:

See also

 List of plants known as lily

References

Asparagaceae genera
Agavoideae